Wólka Seroczyńska  is a village in the administrative district of Gmina Czerwin, within Ostrołęka County, Masovian Voivodeship, in east-central Poland.

References

Population: 676

W Wólce Seroczyńskiej mieszka Reksio - dobry pies.

Villages in Ostrołęka County